Numerous Aboriginal and Torres Strait Islander people in Austrlaia have been notable for their contributions to politics, including participation in governments and activism. Others are noted for their public service, generally and in specific areas like law and education. The lists of Indigenous Australians in public service, activism, law, education and humanities on this page, can never be complete and are fluid, but serve as a primer.

Politics and government 
By 1962–65 Aboriginal and Torres Strait Islanders were granted universal suffrage. Specifically, the Commonwealth Electoral Act 1962 gave all Aboriginal people the option of enrolling to vote in federal elections, whereas the previous Commonwealth Electoral Act 1949 gave Aboriginal people the right to vote in federal elections only if they were able to vote in their state elections. Even with the 1962 ruling, it was not until the Commonwealth Electoral Amendment Act 1983 that voting became compulsory for Aboriginal people, as it was for other Australians.

Vice-regal 
Sir Douglas Nicholls was the first and so far the only Indigenous Australian Governor of an Australian state (Governor of South Australia, 1976–1977).

Politicians 

There have been 52 Indigenous members of the ten Australian legislatures. Of these, 23 have been elected to the Northern Territory assembly, ten to the Australian Federal Parliament, six to the parliament Western Australia, five to the parliament of Queensland, two each to the parliaments of Tasmania, Victoria and New South Wales, and one each to the parliament of South Australia and the Australian Capital Territory assembly. Three have served in multiple parliaments.

Out of the 52 Indigenous Australians elected to any Australian Parliament, 23 have been women.

No one of acknowledged Aboriginal or Torres Strait Islander ancestry has yet been a member of the Norfolk Island assembly. Norfolk Island is a part of Australia, formerly occupied briefly by Polynesian seafarers.

Ernie Bridge was the first Indigenous Australian to become a minister in a government. Neville Bonner was the first Indigenous man to become a member of the Federal Parliament, when he was appointed to fill a casual Senate vacancy in 1971. In 1972 he was the first Indigenous man to (successfully) run for an election. Pat Eatock was the first known Indigenous woman to (unsuccessfully) run for a federal election, in 1972.

Neville Perkins was the first Indigenous Leader of the Opposition in the Northern Territory, as the leader of the Labour Party from 1977–1981. Aden Ridgeway was elected to the Australian Senate in 1998 and served until 2005, and was the only First Nations person serving in Federal Parliament during this time, serving on a number of parliamentary and Senate committees. He was the first Aboriginal person to be selected as deputy leader of the Australian Democrats, and was in this role from April 2001 – October 2002. Ridgeway was the first Indigenous person to use an Indigenous language in Federal Parliament. On 25 August in 1999 in his first speech to the Senate, he stated:"On this special occasion, I make my presence known as an Aborigine and to this chamber I say, perhaps for the first time: Nyandi baaliga Jaingatti. Nyandi mimiga Gumbayynggir. Nya jawgar yaam Gumbayynggir. Translated, it means: My father is Dhunghutti. My mother is Gumbayynggir. And, therefore, I am Gumbayynggir."Marion Scrymgour was the first Indigenous woman to become a minister and has to date been the highest ranked Indigenous woman in a government, when she became Deputy Chief Minister of the Northern Territory from 2007 until 2009. Adam Giles was the first Indigenous Australian to lead a government as Chief Minister of the Northern Territory in 2013. Indigenous minister Kyam Maher was appointed Attorney General of South Australia in March 2022.

Pat Dixon was the first Aboriginal woman elected to Local Government in Australia.

Party leaders 
This section only includes those who held party leadership positions outside of a parliament.

Warren Mundine was the first Indigenous Australian to become National President of the Australian Labor Party.

There have been various leaders of the Australia's First Nations Political Party, however no candidate from this party has been successful in an election.

Public servants

Activists 

 Ghillar Michael Anderson
 Faith Bandler
 Mark Bin Bakar
 Daisy Bindi
 Harold Blair
 Gordon Briscoe
 Robert Bropho
 Burnum Burnum
 Kevin Buzzacott
 Joyce Clague
 Paul Coe
 Essie Coffey
 William Cooper
 Marlene Cummins
 Dexter Daniels
 Shaun Davies
 Megan Davis
 Chicka Dixon
 Mick Dodson
 Pat Dodson
 Mollie Dyer
 Gladys Elphick
 Gary Foley
 Pearl Gibbs
 Matilda House
 Jacqui Katona
 Marcia Langton
 Yami Lester
 Vincent Lingiari
 Michael Mansell
 Yvonne Margarula
 Roy Marika
 Wandjuk Marika
 Hyllus Maris
 Lambert McBride
 Bernard Namok, designer of the Torres Strait Islander Flag
 Oodgeroo Noonuccal
 Jack Patten
 Noel Pearson
 Phillip Waipuldanya Roberts
 Wenten Rubuntja
 Mum (Shirl) Smith
 Harold Thomas, designer of Aboriginal flag
 Margaret Tucker
 Denis Walker
 Neville Williams
 Galarrwuy Yunupingu

Educators 

 Ian Anderson former Pro Vice Chancellor (University of Melbourne)
 MaryAnn Bin-Sallik Pro Vice Chancellor, Aboriginal and Torres Strait Islander Leadership   (University of Western Sydney)
 Larissa Behrendt   (University of Technology Sydney)
 Tom Calma,  Chancellor (University of Canberra)
 Megan Davis (University of New South Wales)
 Mick Dodson (ANU)
 Gail Garvey (Charles Darwin University)
 Stan Grant Chair - Australian-Indigenous Belonging (Charles Sturt University)
 Jaquelyne Hughes (Charles Darwin University)
 Jackie Huggins  (ANU)
 Rosalie Kunoth-Monks former chair (Batchelor Institute of Indigenous Tertiary Education)
 Marcia Langton  Associate Provost, and Foundation Chair of Australian Indigenous Studies (University of Melbourne)
 Stacy Mader (CSIRO)
 John Maynard (University of Newcastle)
 Raymattja Marika (Charles Darwin University)
 Martin Nakata Indigenous Education and Strategy (James Cook University)
 Karlie Noon (Sydney Observatory)
 Lewis O'Brien (Kaurna elder) (University of South Australia)
 Bruce Pascoe (University of Melbourne)
 Hetti Perkins (University of Melbourne)
 Lynette Riley  (University of Sydney)
 Lynette Russell (Monash University)
 Kim Scott (Curtin University)
 Gracelyn Smallwood (Central Queensland University)
 Jakelin Troy, linguist and anthropologist (Director of Aboriginal and Torres Strait Islander Research at the University of Sydney)
 Margaret Valadian  
 Chelsea Watego (Queensland University of Technology)
 Eric Willmot (James Cook University)

Lawyers and judges 

 Larissa Behrendt – legal academic 
 Bob Bellear – first indigenous judge
 Josephine Cashman – former Crown Prosecutor
 Lincoln Crowley - judge of the Supreme Court of Queensland
 Megan Davis - constitutional Lawyer, academic
 Mick Dodson - barrister
 Sue Gordon – magistrate
 Terri Janke – Indigenous cultural intellectual property expert 
 Linda Lovett – barrister
 Lloyd McDermott – first indigenous lawyer
 Hannah McGlade – human rights advocate, lawyer, and UN rep
 Matthew Myers – judge, ALRC Commissioner, academic
 Pat O'Shane – magistrate

Humanities

 Pat Anderson AO (Co Chair - Uluru Statement from the Heart)
 Muriel Bamblett  (Coalition of Peaks, and Chair - SNAICC)
 Brooke Boney (Ambassador - GO Foundation)
 Linda Burney MP (Patron in Chief - GO Foundation)
 Megan Davis (Co Chair - Uluru Statement from the Heart)
 Blak Douglas (Ambassador - GO Foundation)
 Adam Goodes (Founder and Non-Executive Director - GO Foundation)
 Matilda House  (Co-Founder ALS)
 Narelda Jacobs (National Indigenous Advisory Group - Football Australia)
 Mal Meninga (Co-director of Regional Economic Solutions)
 Lowitja O'Donoghue (Patron - Lowitja Institute)
 Michael O'Loughlin (Founder and Deputy Chair - GO Foundation)
 June Oscar AO (Director - Lowitja Institute, and Co Patron - Indigenous Literacy Foundation)
 Rachel Perkins (Boyer Lectures - The End of Silence)
 Dan Sultan (Ambassador - GO Foundation)
 Jared Thomas (Curator ATSI Art and Cultural Material  South Australian Museum
 Pat Turner (Joint Council Co-Chair - Coalition of Peaks)

See also
 List of Indigenous Australian politicians
 Māori politics

References 

Politics